Walter Schnader Tobacco Warehouse is a historic tobacco warehouse located at Lancaster, Lancaster County, Pennsylvania. It was built about 1900, and is a three-story, rectangular brick building with a flat roof and stone foundation.  It is three bays wide.

Besides being used as a warehouse, the building has also been used as a recording studio.  In 2012 a process was begun to buy the building for $245,000 and turn it into a microdistillery making rye whiskey.

It was listed on the National Register of Historic Places in 1990. It is a few doors down from the R. K. Schnader & Sons Tobacco Warehouse which is also listed on the National Register.

References

Industrial buildings and structures on the National Register of Historic Places in Pennsylvania
Industrial buildings completed in 1900
Buildings and structures in Lancaster, Pennsylvania
Tobacco buildings in the United States
National Register of Historic Places in Lancaster, Pennsylvania